Sally of the Scandals is a 1928 American silent crime drama film produced and released by Film Booking Offices of America. It was directed by Lynn Shores and starred Bessie Love.

The film is preserved in the Archives françaises du film du CNC (Bois d'Arcy).

Plot 
Chorus girl Sally Rand (Love) cares for her crippled sister Mary (Lambert). She agrees to marry gangster Bill Reilly (Miley)—whom she believes to be a legitimate businessman—after he promises to pay for an operation for her sister. The lead in the show, Marian Duval (Quimby), is jealous of the attention that Steve Sinclair (Forrest), wealthy backer of the Broadway show, is showing Sally, and she wrongfully accuses Sally of theft. Steve learns of Marian's  and Reilly's lies, and prevents Sally from marrying Reilly. He then makes her the star of the show.

Cast 
 Bessie Love as Sally Rand
 Irene Lambert as Mary Rand
 Allan Forrest as Steve Sinclair
 Margaret Quimby as Marian Duval
 Jimmy Phillips as Kelly
 Jack Raymond as Bennie
 Jerry Miley as Bill Reilly

Production 
Some interior scenes were filmed using the sets and chorus of the stage production of Sunny at the Mayan Theater in Los Angeles.

Reception 
The film received positive reviews, as did Bessie Love's performance.

References

External links 

 
 
 
 
 

1928 crime drama films
1928 films
American black-and-white films
American crime drama films
American silent feature films
Film Booking Offices of America films
Films about musical theatre
Films directed by Lynn Shores
Surviving American silent films
1920s American films
Silent American drama films
1920s English-language films